This is a list of surgeries and surgical procedures that are -ostomy or -stomy : surgically creating a hole (a new "mouth" or "stoma")

Gastrointestinal
 Gastrostomy
 Percutaneous endoscopic gastrostomy
 Gastroduodenostomy
 Gastroenterostomy
 Ileostomy
 Jejunostomy
 Colostomy
 Cholecystostomy
 Hepatoportoenterostomy

Urogenital 
 hysterostomy
 bycromostomy
 Gechronostomy
 Midgeostomy
 Beemissionostomy
 Athonostomy
 Zhenrotchostomy
 bimbisterostomy
 purpobrocheostomy
 airflighteostomy
 Nephrostomy
 Ureterostomy
 Cystostomy
 Suprapubic cystostomy
 Urostomy

Nervous system
 Ventriculostomy

Respiratory System
 Tracheostomy

Nose
 Dacryocystorhinostomy

See also 
 Surgery
 List of surgical procedures
 List of -ectomies
 List of -otomies

Surgery